Lake Kanyaboli is a lake in the Yala Swamp in western Kenya. It is important as a refuge for fish species that have almost disappeared from Lake Victoria.

Location

The Yala Swamp at the mouth of the Yala River covers about  along the northern shore of Lake Victoria.

In the past the Yala River flowed through the eastern 20% of the Yala Swamp into Lake Kanyaboli, then into the main swamp, and then through a small gulf into Lake Victoria.
Today the eastern part of the swamp has been drained, and the river flows directly into the  main swamp.
It is cut off from Lake Kanyaboli by a silt-clay dyke.
Lake Kanyaboli now receives its water from the surrounding catchment area and from back-seepage from the swamp.

Ecological value

Lake Kanyaboli provides a refuge for several species of fish that are no longer present in Lake Victoria.
The introduction of the Nile perch (Lates niloticus) to Lake Victoria caused an ecological disaster which threatens to destroy the ecosystem of the lake.
In the past the lake fishermen caught hundreds of species of fish, many of which were endemic.
Today they rely on the Silver cyprinid (Rastrineobola argentea), the Nile Perch and the Nile tilapia (Oreochromis niloticus).
In 1988 the World Conservation Union listed hundreds of the endemic fish species as Endangered.
Some of these fish are still thriving in Lake Kanyaboli, including several unknown Haplochromis species, Singida tilapia (Oreochromis esculentus) and Victoria tilapia (Oreochromis variabilis).

Notes

Sources

Kanyaboli